Anaïs Laurendon (born 15 April 1985) is a former professional French tennis player.

Her best WTA singles ranking is 180, which she reached on 11 October 2010. Her career-high in doubles is 246, attained on 11 July 2011.

Laurendon played her last match on the ITF Women's Circuit in October 2012, and retired from professional tennis in 2014.

ITF Circuit finals

Singles: 10 (6 titles, 4 runner-ups)

Doubles: 21 (10 titles, 11 runner-ups)

External links
 
 

1985 births
Living people
French female tennis players
People from Loire (department)
Sportspeople from Saint-Étienne